Nicholas Meadows (born 1 January 1962) is a New Zealand cricketer. He played in one List A and two first-class matches for Wellington in 1980/81.

See also
 List of Wellington representative cricketers

References

External links
 

1962 births
Living people
New Zealand cricketers
Wellington cricketers
Sportspeople from Morecambe